The Samuel Jackson House, at 215 S. 2nd East in Beaver, Utah, was built in 1878.  It was listed on the National Register of Historic Places in 1983.

It is a brick, one-story, central chimney hall and parlor plan house.  It was deemed significant because:

References

		
National Register of Historic Places in Beaver County, Utah
Houses completed in 1878